Hannah Amond (born 20 June 1991), known professionally as Hannah Diamond, is an English singer, songwriter, photographer, and visual artist. She has recorded on A.G. Cook's PC Music label since 2013, beginning with her debut single "Pink and Blue". Her music and visual art employs an aesthetic of hyperreality, heavily produced cuteness in tension with sincerity. Her debut studio album, Reflections, was released in 2019. Diamond has also produced visual artwork and promotional materials for other artists and publications.

Music career

2012–2015: Beginnings
Diamond met GFOTY through a friend, and GFOTY introduced her to A. G. Cook. After a vocalist failed to show up to a session with Cook, the two worked on their first musical collaboration. In 2012, they recorded Diamond's first solo song, titled "Attachment". Diamond released her debut single "Pink and Blue" through PC Music in October 2013. The song resembles a lullaby, with a harshly synthetic quality. The attention received by "Pink and Blue" helped to introduce the fledgling label, and it placed 5th on Facts list of "The 100 best tracks of the decade so far".

The following January, Diamond appeared on A. G. Cook's "Keri Baby". The song toyed with the idea of Diamond as an MP3 file or a digital entity on a screen. Diamond made her first live performance in April, at Basement in London. She released "Attachment" as her second single later that month. "Attachment" is a melancholy ballad about modern relationships, with a high-pitched melody backed by farcical harmonies.

Diamond's third solo single "Every Night" was released in November 2014 and became PC Music's first single available through the iTunes Store. The song discusses feelings of desire and showcases a more bold personality than Diamond's earlier songs. Her vocals are childlike and staccato, supported by "oh-ooh-oh" harmonies. The production drew comparisons to La Bouche and "Call Me Maybe" by Carly Rae Jepsen. "Every Night" received nearly 200,000 plays on SoundCloud within two weeks, and it became Diamond's first song to appear on a Billboard chart, reaching 28th on the Emerging Artists chart.

March 2015 saw Diamond head to the US to play the PC Music showcase at the Empire Garage in Austin, Texas as part of SXSW. Her performance was very well received with The Guardian calling it a "well-crafted performance, as much about the aesthetic and choreography as the camp songs" and according to Flavorwire was the one "who impressed the most." On 8 May 2015, Diamond performed as part of a PC Music show at BRIC House in Brooklyn, New York as part of the Red Bull Music Academy Festival. The show was billed as the premiere of Pop Cube, "a multimedia reality network". In November 2015, Diamond released her song "Hi" with a music video made in conjunction with i-D magazine. After having the resources to produce her first music video, she selected "Hi" as a "way of tying up my older material, and a good way of introducing my next phase". Diamond had begun recording a full-length album, originally planned for release in 2015.

2016–2021: Reflections
February 2016 saw Hannah Diamond collaborate with Charli XCX on a new track titled "Paradise", which featured on XCX's Vroom Vroom EP, the first release on XCX's label Vroom Vroom Recordings. According to the singer, the label will combine her "love for bubblegum pop with mystery and darkness." In October that year, Diamond released the new single "Fade Away" with a lyric video via PC Music. On 22 December 2016, Diamond released a free single, "Make Believe", which was produced by easyFun and A.G. Cook.

On 13 December 2017, she released a new mix, Soon I won't see you at all, which contains three new tracks, one of which is a cover of "Concrete Angel" by Gareth Emery. It was made available on YouTube for streaming with a link to a ZIP file of the mix in the description. On 16 November 2018, Diamond released "True", which is the lead single from her debut album Reflections.

On 17 September 2019, Diamond released the song "Part of Me" with Danny L Harle. Just over a month later, on 30 October, Diamond released the single "Invisible" with its accompanying music video. With this release, she also announced the release date for Reflections and revealed the album artwork. On 13 November, Diamond released another single leading up to the release of her album, titled "Love Goes On". The song was released with an accompanying music video.

On 31 October 2019, she announced her first headlining tour "The Invisible Tour" and added new dates on 1 November 4 and 28 November 2019. The tour began on 4 December 2019. On 22 November 2019, her debut album Reflections was released, and the tracklist was revealed the day before. On 5 February 2020, she announced that she will be the opening act in 4 shows for Carly Rae Jepsen’s Dedicated Tour. The Reflections remix album was released in April 2020, and the vinyl was released in early 2020. 

In 2020, Diamond featured on the remix for 100 gecs' "xXXi_wud_nvrstøp_ÜXXx" alongside Estonian rapper Tommy Cash, and appeared on A. G. Cook's two 2020 albums 7G and Apple. In 2021, Diamond appeared on the Danny L Harle single, "Boing Beat", from his debut album Harlecore, and featured on the remix for A. G. Cook's "The Darkness", alongside Sarah Bonito of Kero Kero Bonito. She appeared on labelmate Namasenda's debut Unlimited Ammo mixtape in October 2021, and designed much of the project's single and album artwork.

2022: New music 
Diamond begun teasing a second album in mid-2021 via social media. After debuting a new song at PC Music's Pitchfork Music Festival London showcase and previewing it on TikTok, Diamond released the single "Staring at the Ceiling" on 24 February 2022.

Visual artistry
Growing up, Diamond followed the work of fashion photographers such as Mert and Marcus, David LaChapelle, and Nick Knight. She studied fashion communication and styling, and her early work focused on internet celebrities. She is a member of Diamond Wright, which has made promotional images for QT, latex clothing brand Meat, and PC Music artist Princess Bambi. In 2015, she shot Charli XCX in global commercial campaigns for Boohoo and Lynx Impulse. Before the founding of PC Music, Diamond worked with Cook on marketing material for makeup brand Illamasqua. She has also done work as co-editor and director of photography for LOGO Magazine.

She cited the futuristic visuals for TLC's "Waterfalls" music video as influential for their emphasis on technology. Diamond's music is often inspired by high-definition imagery and fashion campaigns. Cook describes her as an artist "in control of [her] own image", noting Diamond's involvement in producing the promotional material. Her cover artwork uses heavy photo retouching to produce unnatural, hyperreal versions of herself. The covers show Diamond in front of empty, one-dimensional spaces. Her outfits are influenced by London streetwear, and she is known for wearing her trademark pastel pink puffa jacket. January 2016 saw Diamond feature on the cover of OKgrl, a new online platform created by stylist Louby Mcloughlin & DVTK, the ex digital directors of fashion brand Kenzo. Diamond has also spent time designing typefaces, including a new font which was featured in the lyric video for her song, "True".

As a photographer, Diamond's work includes a 2018 cover feature for DIY, featuring Years & Years' Olly Alexander. So far in 2019, Diamond has shot for Sophia Webster's Spring/Summer 2019 campaign, the cover feature of the second issue of the French magazine Jalouse, which features Migos rapper Offset, and she additionally shot a L'Officiel editorial for Charli XCX promoting her new album Charli.

In 2020, Diamond took over a creative director position for UK alt-pop band Sundara Karma. Along with the band's frontman Oscar Pollock, she co-directed the music video for their single "Kill Me", as well as made a series of promotional graphics, including the single artwork. Shots from their visual collaboration were also featured on the DIY Magazine cover in 2019.

Discography

Studio albums

Extended plays

Singles

As lead artist

As featured artist

Other appearances

Tours

Headlining 

 The Invisible Tour (2019-2020)

Opening act 

 Carly Rae Jepsen - The Dedicated Tour (2020)

References

External links

1991 births
Living people
English songwriters
Musicians from London
PC Music artists
Writers from London
English women pop singers
Musicians from Norwich
21st-century English women singers
21st-century English singers
English women in electronic music
Hyperpop musicians